Independence Stadium is a stadium owned by the city of Shreveport, Louisiana and is the home of the Independence Bowl.

Formerly known as State Fair Stadium and Fairgrounds Stadium, it is the site of the annual Independence Bowl post-season college football game, initially (1976) the Bicentennial Bowl.  Before that, it was the home venue of the Shreveport Steamer of the short-lived World Football League (1974–75).  It also served as a neutral site for the annual Arkansas–LSU football rivalry from 1924 to 1936. The 1924 game featured a silver football trophy as part of the dedication ceremonies for the new stadium.

The stadium is also host to numerous high school football games and soccer matches, since many schools in Shreveport lack an on-campus facility. Independence Stadium also hosted the LHSAA state football championship games in 2005 after the Louisiana Superdome suffered heavy damage from Hurricane Katrina. 

From 1978 to 1983, Independence Stadium was home to the city's two teams in the  American Football Association, the Shreveport Steamer (with naming rights purchased from the defunct WFL team) and the Shreveport Americans. It hosted the AFA's first championship game, 1978's American Bowl I, which the Steamer won 17–14 over the San Antonio Charros.

In 1994–95, Independence Stadium was home to the Shreveport Pirates of the Canadian Football League, which was attempting U.S. expansion at the time.

In the late 1990s, the stadium capacity was expanded from approximately 40,000 to 50,832. In 2005, to meet accommodations of the upcoming Independence Bowl in 2006, the stadium went through a renovation to extend the capacity from 52,000 to 59,000. In 2008, the City of Shreveport created an entire new section of the stadium. This portion would allow the stadium capacity to be expanded only if need be. This expansion would put the total capacity at 63,000. This was part of a grand upgrading plan that improved all aspects of the facility, from concourses to playing surface.

In 2001, Independence Stadium hosted the inaugural year of the annual Port City Classic—an NCAA college football competition featuring Southern University of Baton Rouge—in an effort to revive the old State Fair Classic game. The classic spun-off separately from the fair the following year and became an early September game. Eventually it also hosted a contest between Louisiana Tech University of Ruston and Grambling State University of Grambling.

Independence Stadium was considered as a possible playing site for the New Orleans Saints during the 2005 NFL season due to Hurricane Katrina, but Shreveport eventually lost out to the Alamodome in San Antonio, Texas, and Louisiana State University's Tiger Stadium in Baton Rouge. However, Independence Stadium eventually was chosen to host the Saints' first preseason home game for the 2006 season while the Louisiana Superdome prepared for its grand re-opening. Field Turf was installed as the stadium's playing surface in 2010. It had been natural grass before that from the opening of the stadium. 

In 2010, a Texas University Interscholastic League playoff game was played featuring Mesquite Horn high school and the technical host Longview.  Longview won, 28–14. The first time Texas teams met in Louisiana for a playoff game was in 2006 when Texas High School  from Texarkana topped Dallas Highland Park with quarterback Ryan Mallett. That game also was hosted at Independence Stadium.

The stadium also hosts concerts and other events. The south end zone of the stadium borders Interstate 20.

See also
List of soccer stadiums in the United States

References

External links
 Independence Stadium

Independence Bowl
College football venues
NCAA bowl game venues
Canadian Football League venues
Sports venues in Shreveport, Louisiana
American football venues in Louisiana
Soccer venues in Louisiana
High school football venues in Louisiana
High school football venues in the United States
Music venues in Louisiana
Shreveport Pirates
Shreveport Steamer
Sports venues completed in 1924
1924 establishments in Louisiana
Canadian football venues in the United States